Douglas Campbell (born 30 September 1960) is a male retired British swimmer.

Swimming career
Campbell competed in three events at the 1980 Summer Olympics. Representing Scotland, he won bronze medals in the 4×200 m freestyle relay and 4x100 medley relay at the 1982 Commonwealth Games. At the ASA National British Championships he won the 100 metres backstroke title in 1980 and the 200 metres backstroke title three times (1979, 1980, 1981).

References

External links
 

1960 births
Living people
Scottish male swimmers
British male swimmers
Olympic swimmers of Great Britain
Swimmers at the 1980 Summer Olympics
Swimmers at the 1982 Commonwealth Games
Commonwealth Games bronze medallists for Scotland
Commonwealth Games medallists in swimming
Place of birth missing (living people)
Medallists at the 1982 Commonwealth Games